Grindleford is a civil parish in the Derbyshire Dales district of Derbyshire, England. The parish contains 26 listed buildings that are recorded in the National Heritage List for England. Of these, one is listed at Grade I, the highest of the three grades, one is at Grade II*, the middle grade, and the others are at Grade II, the lowest grade.  The parish contains the village of Grindleford and the surrounding countryside.  Most of the listed buildings are houses, cottages and farmhouses and associated structures.  The other listed buildings include a former gatehouse converted into a chapel, two bridges, a milestone and a milepost, a former cotton mill, a former toll house, and another chapel.


Key

Buildings

References

Citations

Sources

 

Lists of listed buildings in Derbyshire